Navana Tower is a high-rise located in Dhaka, Bangladesh. It is located in Gulshan, one of the central business districts of the metropolis. It rises up to a height of 100 metres (328 ft) and has 23 floors. Navana Tower is the nineteenth tallest high-rise in Dhaka.

See also
List of tallest buildings in Bangladesh
List of tallest buildings in Dhaka

References

Buildings and structures in Dhaka
Residential buildings in Bangladesh
Skyscrapers in Bangladesh